Bill Gerber (born April 30, 1957) is an American film and television producer. He was President of Production at Warner Bros. Pictures, before establishing an existing and long-standing producing deal with the studio. Bill is known for producing A Star Is Born (2018), Gran Torino (2008), A Very Long Engagement (2004) and Grudge Match (2013). As an executive he had a hand in dozens of movies including: L.A. Confidential (1997), JFK (1991), Heat (1995), You've Got Mail (1998), The Perfect Storm (2000), Three Kings (1999) and the Harry Potter series.

In 2019, Gerber was nominated for an Oscar for Best Picture for A Star Is Born which he also received a Golden Globe nomination for.  Gerber also received a Golden Globe nomination for Best Foreign Language Film for A Very Long Engagement in 2005. In 2002, Gerber was nominated for Emmy for Outstanding Made for Television Movie for James Dean which James Franco received a Golden Globe for Best Actor in the title role. In 2020, he received a Sports Emmy for the HBO documentary series, What's My Name: Muhammad Ali.

Filmography 

He was a producer in all films unless otherwise noted.

Film

As an actor

Thanks

Television

References

External links

After 11 Years Pushing ‘A Star Is Born’, Producer Bill Gerber Is Restoring Neil Young In New Woodstock Documentary on Deadline
How Lady Gaga & Bradley Cooper Shot at Coachella, Glastonbury & More for 'A Star Is Born': Producer Bill Gerber Explains on Billboard

American film producers
Living people
Place of birth missing (living people)
1957 births